Gügəvar (also, Gyugyavar) is a village and municipality in the Yardymli Rayon of Azerbaijan.  It has a population of 595.  The municipality consists of the villages of Gügəvar and Tiləkənd.

References 

Populated places in Yardimli District